Paweł Juliusz Skutecki (born 26 February 1975 in Bydgoszcz) is a Polish politician, journalist, anti-vax activist, and former deputy in the Sejm from 2015 to 2019.

In 2015, he was elected to Sejm, starting from the Kukiz'15 list in the Bydgoszcz constituency. He ran for re-election in 2019 starting from the Confederation list but was not elected. He was a candidate in the 2019–20 Confederation presidential primary.

References

External links
 https://konfederacja.net/prawybory/ 

Kukiz'15 politicians
Living people
Politicians from Bydgoszcz
Members of the Polish Sejm 2019–2023
Kazimierz Wielki University in Bydgoszcz alumni
1975 births
Confederation Liberty and Independence politicians